The mrxvt program is a terminal emulator for X Window System. It provides DEC VT102 compatible terminals.

mrxvt is based on rxvt version 2.7.11 CVS (in 2004), and features most of functionality of rxvt.  Unlike rxvt, it provides  multiple tabs. Like rxvt, mrxvt aims to be light, fast, flexible and does not depend on desktop environments like GNOME or KDE.

The primary features of mrxvt include (but are not limited  to) multiple tabs, dynamically changeable tab titles, customizable command for each tab, input broadcasting, fast pseudo-transparency with tinting, user supplied background images (XPM, JPEG, PNG), off-focus fading, text shadow, multiple style (NeXT, Rxvt, Xterm, SGI, Plain) scrollbars, XIM, multi-language support (Chinese, Korean, Japanese), Freetype font and logging.

mrxvt does not have Unicode support, though a Unicode version is in development.

This vulnerability led to mrxvt being removed from the OpenBSD ports collection.

See also

List of terminal emulators

References

External links
Project home page
Download

X Window programs
Free software programmed in C
Free terminal emulators